This article documents the discography of American pop, Christian, and country music singer, Debby Boone. She first recorded with her family, charting twice with her sisters as the Boones on the Billboard AC chart. As a solo artist, Boone has released 12 studio albums and four compilation albums. Boone also placed 15 singles on the Billboard Hot 100, Hot Country Songs, and Hot Adult Contemporary Tracks chart including two Number One songs – "You Light Up My Life" (10 weeks – Hot 100, 1 week – AC) and "Are You on the Road to Lovin' Me Again" (1 week – Country). Boone's You Light Up My Life album and single were both certified platinum.

Studio albums

Compilation albums

Reissues

Other albums

Singles

1970s

1980s

Other singles

Guest singles

Charted B-sides

Other album appearances/credits
 1978: The Magic Of Lassie – various artists; "Brass Rings & Day Dreams", "There'll Be Other Friday Nights", "When You're Loved"
 1979: On This Christmas Night – various artists; "The Gift Of Love"
 1980: Cranston Thorndike & The Dragon – various artists; voice of Cranston's Mother, music/lyrics co-writer
 1982: Good Night, Sleep Tight – various artists; "I Thank the Father"
 1983: Solo –  Steve Archer; "Evermore" (duet)
 1989: Bowling in Paris –  Stephen Bishop; background vocals
 1995: Sing Me To Sleep, Mommy – various artists; "Sleep My Child"
 1996: The Holiday Collection: Volume 1 – various artists; "The Gift Of Life"
 1996: A Hollywood Christmas – various artists; "White Christmas"
 1997: Cole Porter: A Musical Toast – various artists; "Do I Love You?"
 1998: My Dream Come True –  Ryan DeHeus; "Someone To Watch Over Me"
 2000: Shake Those Hula Hips –  Big Kahuna and the Copa Cat Pack; "Little Grass Shack", "Princess Poo-poo-ly Has Plenty Papaya"
 2008: The Real Me –  John Sawyer; "I'm Always On Your Side"
 2012: Christmas Around the World with Perry Como; featured guest

Notes
A^ Reissue of Home for Christmas (1989) with different cover art.
B^ Reissue of Be Thou My Vision

References

Country music discographies
Discographies of American artists